Singa, also called striped orb-weavers, is a genus of  orb-weaver spiders first described by C. L. Koch in 1836. They are small for orb-weavers, reaching  or less in body length, excluding the legs.

Species
 it contains twenty-eight species:
Singa albobivittata Caporiacco, 1947 – Tanzania
Singa albodorsata Kauri, 1950 – South Africa
Singa alpigena Yin, Wang & Li, 1983 – China
Singa alpigenoides Song & Zhu, 1992 – China
Singa ammophila Levy, 2007 – Israel
Singa aussereri Thorell, 1873 – Europe
Singa bifasciata Schenkel, 1936 – China
Singa chota Tikader, 1970 – India
Singa concinna Karsch, 1884 – São Tomé and Príncipe
Singa cruciformis Yin, Peng & Wang, 1994 – China
Singa cyanea (Worley, 1928) – USA
Singa eugeni Levi, 1972 – USA
Singa haddooensis Tikader, 1977 – India (Andaman Is.)
Singa hamata (Clerck, 1757) (type) – Europe, Turkey, Russia (Europe to Far East), Caucasus to Central Asia, China, Korea, Japan
Singa hilira Barrion & Litsinger, 1995 – Philippines
Singa kansuensis Schenkel, 1936 – China
Singa keyserlingi McCook, 1894 – USA, Canada
Singa lawrencei (Lessert, 1930) – Congo
Singa leucoplagiata (Simon, 1899) – Indonesia (Sumatra)
Singa lucina (Audouin, 1826) – Mediterranean to Central Asia
S. l. eburnea (Simon, 1929) – Algeria, Tunisia
Singa myrrhea (Simon, 1895) – India
Singa neta (O. Pickard-Cambridge, 1872) – Mediterranean, Iraq
Singa nitidula C. L. Koch, 1844 – Europe, Turkey, Russia (Europe to Far East), Caucasus to Central Asia
Singa perpolita (Thorell, 1892) – Singapore
Singa semiatra L. Koch, 1867 – Mediterranean, Ukraine, Russia (Europe), Iraq, Iran
Singa simoniana Costa, 1885 – Italy (Sardinia)
Singa theodori (Thorell, 1894) – Indonesia (Java)

See also
Hypsosinga

References

Araneidae
Articles created by Qbugbot